Vincenzo A. Sagun, officially the Municipality of Vincenzo A. Sagun (Subanen: Benwa Vincenzo A. Sagun; Chavacano: Municipalidad de Vincenzo A. Sagun), is a 5th class municipality in the province of Zamboanga del Sur, Philippines. According to the 2020 census, it has a population of 24,852 people.

The municipality is named after Zamboanga del Sur Governor and Representative Vincenzo Sagun.

History
The municipality was created through Batas Pambansa Blg. 173. The barangays of Cabatan, Danan, Limason, Lumbal, Bio-os Maraya, Linoguayan, Walingwaling, Kapatagan, Cogon, Lunib, Maculay, and Sagucan all in Margosatubig with the seat of government of the new municipality shall be in Barangay Cabatan. Through Proclamation No. 2188, s. 1982, a plebiscite was held on May 17, 1982 to coincide with the barangay elections to minimize government expenses relative to this political exercise. Majority of the electorate of the said barangays of Margosatubig voted in favor of the creation of the municipality.

Geography
Vicenzo A. Sagun is a coastal municipality that is found in the southern section of Zamboanga del Sur. It is in the Baganian Peninsula, some 60 kilometers northwest of the province's capital of Pagadian City. As for its boundaries, the municipality of Margosatubig can be found on the north, while the south is occupied by Maligay Bay and Dumanquilas Bay, on the southeast and the southwest, respectively. The municipality of Dimataling cradles it on the east. The total area of Vincenzo A. Sagun makes up 8.15% of Zamboanga del Sur's area, and .041% of the whole Zamboanga Peninsula Region.

Of the 14 barangays that Vincenzo Sagun has, 11 of them are coastal, and most of the inhabitants are fisherfolk by trade and livelihood. The municipality is noted for its rich marine resources, with some parts being groomed to be prime tourist aquatic spot. One of the Vincenzo Sagun's featured products are the dried fish which are usually exported to the other provinces.

Climate

Barangays
Vincenzo A. Sagun is politically subdivided into 14 barangays.

 Ambulon
 Biu-os
 Cogon
 Danan
 Kabatan (Poblacion)
 Kapatagan
 Limason
 Linoguayan
 Lumbal
 Lunib
 Maculay
 Maraya
 Sagucan
 Walingwaling

Demographics

Economy

Education

College
Josephina H. Cerilles State College-Vincenzo Sagun External Studies Unit

High schools
Cogon National High School
Judge Edmundo S. Pinga National High School
Kabatan National High School
Sagucan National High School

References

External links
 Vincenzo A. Sagun Profile at PhilAtlas.com
 [ Philippine Standard Geographic Code]
Philippine Census Information

Municipalities of Zamboanga del Sur